The Rosenwald School Building Fund and Associated Buildings Multiple Property Submission is a multiple property submission of historic Rosenwald Schools in Alabama that were listed together on the National Register of Historic Places. The schools are historically significant for their contribution to African American education in the state. They were designed and partially built with funds from the Rosenwald Fund during the period spanning from 1913 to 1937. The fund provided one-third of the construction money, with the community and state splitting the remainder.

The first 80 Rosenwald Schools were built in Alabama, with the first to be completed in Loachapoka in 1913. The Rosenwald Program was then expanded to 14 other southeastern states after the first 80 in Alabama. By the end of the program, a total of 387 schools, 7 teacher's houses, and several vocational buildings had been completed within the state.  Following desegregation many of the former schools were scavenged for building materials, converted to other uses, or demolished by neglect. At the time of the multiple property listing, the commission charged with documenting and nominating the schools had only located seven surviving Rosenwald-funded structures, with six eligible to be listed under the National Register of Historic Places criteria.

See also
National Register of Historic Places Multiple Property Submissions in Alabama

References

National Register of Historic Places Multiple Property Submissions in Alabama